Eero Saarinen (August 20, 1910 – September 1, 1961) was a Finnish-American architect and industrial designer noted for his wide-ranging array of designs for buildings and monuments.  Saarinen is best known for designing the General Motors Technical Center in Michigan, Dulles International Airport outside Washington, D.C., the TWA Flight Center (now TWA Hotel) in New York City, and the Gateway Arch in St. Louis, Missouri. He was the son of Finnish architect Eliel Saarinen.

Early life and education
Eero Saarinen was born in Hvitträsk on August 20, 1910, to Finnish architect Eliel Saarinen and his second wife, Louise, on his father's 37th birthday. They immigrated to the United States in 1923, when Eero was thirteen. He grew up in Bloomfield Hills, Michigan, where his father taught and was dean of the Cranbrook Academy of Art, and he took courses in sculpture and furniture design there. He had a close relationship with fellow students Charles and Ray Eames, and became good friends with Florence Knoll (née Schust).

Saarinen began studies in sculpture at the Académie de la Grande Chaumière in Paris, France, in September 1929. He then went on to study at the Yale School of Architecture, completing his studies in 1934. Subsequently, he toured Europe for two years and returned to the United States in 1936 to work in his father's architectural practice.

Architectural career

After his tour of Europe and North Africa, Saarinen returned to Cranbrook to work for his father and teach at the academy. His father's firm was Saarinen, Swanson and Associates, headed by Eliel Saarinen and Robert Swanson from the late 1930s until Eliel's death in 1950. The firm was located in Bloomfield Hills, Michigan, until 1961 when the practice was moved to Hamden, Connecticut.

Saarinen first received critical recognition while still working for his father, for a chair designed together with Charles Eames for the Organic Design in Home Furnishings competition in 1940, for which they received first prize. The Tulip chair, like all other Saarinen chairs, was taken into production by the Knoll furniture company, founded by Hans Knoll, who married Saarinen family friend Florence (Schust) Knoll. Further attention came also while Saarinen was still working for his father when he took first prize in the 1948 competition for the design of the Gateway Arch National Park (then known as the Jefferson National Expansion Memorial) in St. Louis. The memorial wasn't completed until the 1960s. The competition award was mistakenly sent to his father because both he and his father had entered the competition separately. When the committee sent out the letter stating Saarinen had won the competition, it was mistakenly addressed to his father.

During his long association with Knoll he designed many important pieces of furniture, including the Grasshopper lounge chair and ottoman (1946), the Womb chair and ottoman (1948), the Womb settee (1950), side and arm chairs (1948–1950), and his most famous Tulip or Pedestal group (1956), which featured side and arm chairs, dining, coffee and side tables, as well as a stool. All of these designs were highly successful except for the Grasshopper lounge chair, which, although in production through 1965, was not a big success.

One of Saarinen's earliest works to receive international acclaim is the Crow Island School in Winnetka, Illinois (1940). The first major work by Saarinen, in collaboration with his father, was the General Motors Technical Center in Warren, Michigan, which follows the rationalist design Miesian style, incorporating steel and glass but with the addition of accent of panels in two shades of blue. The GM Technical Center was constructed in 1956, with Saarinen using models, which allowed him to share his ideas with others and gather input from other professionals.

With the success of this project, Saarinen was then invited by other major American corporations such as John Deere, IBM, and CBS to design their new headquarters or other major corporate buildings. Despite the overall rational design philosophy, the interiors usually contained dramatic sweeping staircases as well as furniture designed by Saarinen, such as the Pedestal series. In the 1950s he began to receive more commissions from American universities for campus designs and individual buildings. These include Birch Hall at Antioch College, the Noyes dormitory at Vassar and Hill College House at the University of Pennsylvania as well as the Ingalls ice rink, Ezra Stiles & Morse Colleges at Yale University, the MIT Chapel and neighboring Kresge Auditorium at MIT and the University of Chicago Law School building and grounds.

Saarinen served on the jury for the Sydney Opera House commission in 1957 and was crucial in the selection of the now internationally known design by Jørn Utzon. A jury which did not include Saarinen had discarded Utzon's design in the first round; Saarinen reviewed the discarded designs, recognized a quality in Utzon's design, and ultimately assured the commission of Utzon.

After his father's death in July 1950, Saarinen founded his own architect's office, Eero Saarinen and Associates. He was the principal partner from 1950 until his death. The firm carried out many of its most important works, including the Bell Labs Holmdel Complex in Holmdel Township, New Jersey; the Gateway Arch in St. Louis, Missouri; the Miller House in Columbus, Indiana; the TWA Flight Center at John F. Kennedy International Airport, which he worked on with Charles J. Parise; the main terminal of Washington Dulles International Airport; and the new East Air Terminal of the old Athens airport in Greece, which opened in 1967. Many of these projects use catenary curves in their structural designs.

In 1949–50, Saarinen was hired by the then-new Brandeis University to create a master plan for the campus. Saarinen's plan A Foundation for Learning: Planning the Campus of Brandeis University (1949; second edition 1951), developed with Matthew Nowicki, called for a central academic complex surrounded by residential quadrangles along a peripheral road. The plan was never built but was useful in attracting donors. Saarinen did build a few residential structures on the campus, including Ridgewood Quadrangle (1950), Sherman Student Center (1952) and Shapiro Dormitory at Hamilton Quadrangle (1952). These have all been either demolished or extensively remodeled.

One of his best-known thin-shell concrete structures in America is the Kresge Auditorium at MIT. Another thin-shell structure is Yale's Ingalls Rink, which has suspension cables connected to a single concrete backbone and is nicknamed "the whale". His most famous work is the TWA Flight Center, which represents the culmination of his previous designs and his genius for expressing the ultimate purpose of each building, what he called the "style for the job". In 2019 the terminal was transformed into the TWA Hotel.

Saarinen designed the Kleinhans Music Hall in Buffalo, New York, together with his father, Eliel Saarinen. He also designed the Embassy of the United States in London, which opened in 1960, and the former Embassy of the United States in Oslo.

Saarinen worked with his father, mother, and sister designing elements of the Cranbrook campus in Bloomfield Hills, Michigan, including the Cranbrook School, Kingswood School, the Cranbrook Art Academy, and the Cranbrook Science Institute. Eero Saarinen's leaded-glass designs are a prominent feature of these buildings throughout the campus.

Non-architectural activities

Saarinen was recruited by Donal McLaughlin, an architectural school friend from his Yale days, to join the military service in the Office of Strategic Services (OSS). Saarinen was assigned to draw illustrations for bomb disassembly manuals and to provide designs for the Situation Room in the White House. Saarinen worked full-time for the OSS until 1944.

Honors and awards
Eero Saarinen was elected a Fellow of the American Institute of Architects in 1952. He was elected a member of the National Institute of Arts and Letters in 1954. In 1962, he was posthumously awarded a gold medal by the American Institute of Architects.

In 1940, he received two first prizes together with Charles Eames in the furniture design competition of the Museum of Modern Art in New York City. In 1948, he won the first prize in the Jefferson National Monument competition. The Boston Arts festival in 1953 gave him their Grand Architectural Award. He received the First Honor award of the American Institute of Architects twice, in 1955 and 1956, and their gold medal in 1962.  In 1965 he took first prize in US Embassy competition in London.

Personal life
Saarinen became a naturalized citizen of the United States in 1940.

In 1939 Saarinen married the sculptor Lilian Swann. They had two children, Eric and Susan Saarinen. Their marriage ended in divorce in 1954. That same year Saarinen married Aline Bernstein Louchheim, an art critic at The New York Times. Saarinen had met Louchheim when she came to Detroit to interview him for his contributions to the recently completed General Motors Technical Center. Saarinen and Louchheim had one son together whom they named Eames after Saarinen's collaborator Charles Eames. In addition to their respective contributions to architecture, design, and criticism, Eero and Aline Saarinen are remembered for their affectionate and detailed personal papers, held at the Archives of American Art.

Death
Saarinen died on September 1, 1961, at the age of 51 while undergoing an operation for a brain tumor. He was in Ann Arbor, Michigan, overseeing the completion of a new music building for the University of Michigan School of Music, Theatre & Dance. He is buried at White Chapel Memorial Cemetery, in Troy, Michigan.

Legacy
Saarinen is now considered one of the masters of American 20th-century architecture. There has been a surge of interest in Saarinen's work in recent years, including a major exhibition and several books. This is partly because the Roche and Dinkeloo office {requires further explanation} has donated its Saarinen archives to Yale University, but also because Saarinen's oeuvre can be said to fit in with present-day concerns about pluralism of styles. He was criticized in his own time—most vociferously by Yale's Vincent Scully—for having no identifiable style; one explanation for this is that Saarinen's vision was adapted to each individual client and project, which were never exactly the same. Scully also criticized him for designing buildings that were "packages," with "no connection with human use . . . at once cruelly inhuman and trivial, as if they had been designed by the Joint Chiefs of Staff."

The papers of Aline and Eero Saarinen, from 1906 to 1977, were donated in 1973 to the Archives of American Art, Smithsonian Institution (by Charles Alan, Aline Saarinen's brother and executor of her estate). In 2006, the bulk of these primary source documents on the couple were digitized and posted online on the Archives' website.

The Eero Saarinen collection at the Canadian Centre for Architecture documents eight built projects, including the old Athens airport in Greece, the former US Embassy Chanceries in Oslo, Norway and London, England, corporate projects for John Deere, CBS, and IBM, and the North Christian Church in Columbus, Indiana.

An exhibition of Saarinen's work, Eero Saarinen: Shaping the Future, was organized by the Finnish Cultural Institute in New York in collaboration with Yale School of Architecture, the National Building Museum, and the Museum of Finnish Architecture. The exhibition toured in Europe and the United States from 2006 to 2010, including a stint at the National Building Museum in Washington, DC. The exhibition was accompanied by the book Eero Saarinen: Shaping the Future.

In 2016 Eero Saarinen: The Architect Who Saw the Future, a film about Saarinen (co-produced by his son Eric), premiered on the PBS American Masters series.

See also
 List of works by Eero Saarinen
 Tensile architecture
 Thin-shell structure

References

Sources
 
  Episode featuring the Cranbrook House and Gardens.

External links

  Commercial furniture sales blog mentioning the Womb chair.
 Saarinen, Eero (1910–1961). Kansallisbiografia. 
 Trans World Airlines Unit Terminal Building, New York International Airport, architectural drawings, 1958-1961 Held by the Department of Drawings & Archives, Avery Architectural and Fine Arts Library, Columbia University.
 
  Earl V. Moore Building by Eero Saarinen.
  Balthazar Korab Collection at the Library of Congress.
  The Concordia Campus Through Time.
Digital Collections: Eero Saarinen Collection.Yale University Library. Containing images and drawings from Saarinen's archives.
Eero Saarinen Collection (MS 593). Manuscripts and Archives, Yale University Library.
  Saarinen Tulip Chair.
 
 Eero Saarinen Exhibitions at Cranbrook Art Museum. 
  Blueprints, Winter 2007–08.
Eero Saarinen's church, bank, and Miller House in Columbus, Indiana
 Finding aid for the Eero Saarinen collection, Canadian Centre for Architecture (digitized items)
 

Modernist architects
20th-century American architects
20th-century Finnish architects
1910 births
1961 deaths
 01
American ecclesiastical architects
American furniture designers
Finnish furniture designers
Finnish industrial designers
Modernist architects from the United States
Fellows of the American Institute of Architects
Alumni of the Académie de la Grande Chaumière
Cranbrook Academy of Art faculty
Finnish emigrants to the United States
People from Kirkkonummi
People from Uusimaa Province (Grand Duchy of Finland)
Deaths from brain cancer in the United States
Yale University alumni
Yale School of Architecture alumni
Mid-century modern
Naturalized citizens of the United States
Recipients of the AIA Gold Medal